South Province is one of the seven short-lived provinces of the Maldives. The provinces were created in a decentralization attempt by the Nasheed administration in 2008. It was governed by the Minister of State for Home Affairs, Ms. Thilmeeza Hussain. Rejecting this change, the Parliament saw the abolition of the province system in 2010, through a newly enacted Decentralization Act. It consisted of Gnaviyani Atoll and Addu City. Its capital was Hithadhoo. Its population (2006 census) was 25,662.

References

Provinces of the Maldives